Marc Ducret (born 19 August 1957) is a contemporary avant-garde jazz guitarist who frequently collaborates with saxophonist Tim Berne.

Ducret's guitar style is idiosyncratic, having been called "highly original and very expressive," but also "Metheny-like."

Selected discography
As leader
 1987 La théorie du pilier (Label Bleu)
 1989 Le Kodo (Label Bleu)
 1990 Gris (Label Bleu)
 1991 News from the Front (JMT)
 1997 Détail (Winter & Winter)
 1998 Un Certain Malaise (Screwgun)
 1999 L'ombra di Verdi (Screwgun)
 2003 Qui parle? (Sketch)
 2006 Trio Live (self-produced)
 2006 Trio Live No. 2 (self-produced)
 2009 Le sens de la marche (Illusions)
 2011 Tower, vol. 1 (Ayler)
 2011 Tower, vol. 2 (Ayler)
 2012 Tower, vol. 4 (Ayler)
 2013 Tower, vol. 3 (Ayler)
 2014 Tower-Bridge (Ayler)
 2015 Metatonal (Ayler)
 2019 Lady M (Illusions)
 2023 Palm Sweat (Screwgun/Out Of Your Head)

With Tim Berne
 Pace Yourself (JMT, 1991)
 Diminutive Mysteries (Mostly Hemphill) (JMT, 1993)
 Nice View (JMT, 1994)
 Lowlife: The Paris Concert (JMT, 1995)
 Poisoned Minds: The Paris Concert (JMT, 1995)
 Memory Select: The Paris Concert (JMT, 1995)
 Big Satan (Winter & Winter, 1997)
 Open, Coma (Screwgun, 2001)
 Science Friction (Screwgun, 2002)
 The Sevens (New World, 2002)
 The Sublime And (Thirsty Ear, 2003)
 Souls Saved Hear (Thirsty Ear, 2004)
 Livein Cognito (Screwgun, 2007)
 Seconds (Screwgun, 2007)
 Insomnia (Clean Feed, 2011)
 The Fantastic Mrs. 10 (Intakt, 2020)
 Science Friction +size (9donkeys, 2020)
 Adobe Probe (9donkeys, 2020)
 5 (9donkeys, 2021)

With Samuel Blaser
 2012 As the Sea (Hathut)
 2011 Boundless (Hathut)
 2018 Taktlos Zürich 2017 (Hathut)
 2020 Audio Rebel (Blaser Music)
 2020 ABC Vol. 1 (Blaser Music)
 2020 ABC Vol. 2 (Blaser Music)
 2020 Moods (Blaser Music)
 2021 Voyageurs (Jazzdor Series)

With Hank Roberts
Green (Winter & Winter, 2008)

With Liūtas Mockūnas
Silent Vociferation (NoBusiness Records, 2009)

References

External links
    
 Official site
 A 2000 interview with Big Satan
 Another interview
 

1957 births
Living people
Avant-garde jazz guitarists
Free jazz guitarists
French jazz guitarists
French male guitarists
French male jazz musicians
Big Satan members
Orchestre National de Jazz members
Winter & Winter Records artists
JMT Records artists
Thirsty Ear Recordings artists
Label Bleu artists
NoBusiness Records artists